Michel Tardieu (born 10 April 1938) is a French scholar working on religious currents in Late Antiquity and in the Near and Far East.

He was born in Mareuil, Dordogne and educated in a petit séminaire and with the Dominicans in Toulouse before becoming a researcher in state higher education. Work in Iraq and neighbouring countries led to the acquisition of a number of Late Antique Near Eastern languages, extending to extensive familiarity also with Persian and Chinese.

Tardieu was appointed to the École pratique des hautes études Vth section (where he succeeded Pierre Hadot) and subsequently to the Collège de France (1991).

He has worked mainly on Manichaeism and Gnosticism, on currents related to these in Zoroastrianism. Tardieu has published on Nag Hammadi and other major 20th-century discoveries of texts in Egypt and the wider Near East.

A theory of Tardieu's, which has remained far from securing unanimous adhesion, developed in his work, Les paysages reliques (1990), concerns a hypothetical removal by Simplicius of Cilicia and other Athenian Neoplatonic writers after the closure of the Schools by Justinian (529) to Harran (or Carrhae) in Mesopotamia.

Selected bibliography

Books 
 Trois mythes gnostiques. Adam, Éros et  les animaux d'Égypte dans un écrit de Nag Hammadi (II, 5), éd. Brepols, 1974
 Le  manichéisme, coll. Que sais-je?, n°1940,  éd. P.U.F., 1997 (éd. orig. 1981)
 Écrits gnostiques. Codex  de Berlin, éd. Cerf, 1984
 Introduction  à la littérature gnostique, I. Collections retrouvées avant 1945, in collaboration with J.-D. Dubois, éd.Cerf/CNRS, 1986
 Études manichéennes. Bibliographie  critique 1977-1986, éd. Institut Français de  Recherche en Iran, 1988
  Les paysages reliques. Routes  et haltes syriennes d'Isidore à Simplicius, éd. Vrin, 1990
 Recherches sur la formation  de l'Apocalypse de Zostrien et les sources de Marius Victorinus, coll. Res Orientales, IX, éd. Vrin, 1996

Editions and series 
 H. Lewy, Chaldæan Oracles and Theurgy. Mysticism, Magic, and  Platonism in the Later Roman Empire, Nouvelle édition par M.  Tardieu, éd. Brepols, 1978
 Michel Tardieu, Les Règles de l'interprétation, éd. Cerf, 1987
 Michel Tardieu, La Formation des canons scripturaires, éd. Cerf, 1993
 B. Lauret et M. Tardieu  (éd.), A. v. Harnack. Marcion. L’évangile du Dieu étranger. Une  monographie sur l’histoire de la fondation de l’Église catholique, trad. B. Lauret et suivi de contributions de B. Lauret, G. Monnot  et É. Poulat, avec un essai de M. Tardieu, éd. Cerf, 2005 (éd. orig. 2003)

Articles

References

Living people
People from Dordogne
1938 births
20th-century French historians
21st-century French historians
French historians of religion
Academic staff of the Collège de France
Academic staff of the École pratique des hautes études